Bieniowice  is a village in the administrative district of Gmina Kunice, within Legnica County, Lower Silesian Voivodeship, in south-western Poland.

References

Villages in Legnica County